The World Cyber Games 2001 was held in Seoul, South Korea from the December 5th to the 9th. Total prize money was $245,000.

Official games

First-person shooter (FPS)
 Half-Life: Counter-Strike
 Quake III: Arena
 Unreal Tournament

Real-Time Strategy (RTS)
 Age of Empires II: The Conquerors
 StarCraft: Brood War

Sport
 FIFA 2001

Results

World Cyber Games events
2001 in esports
2001 in South Korean sport
Esports in South Korea